The Llanelli Talking Newspaper is a Welsh talking newspaper covering the areas of Llanelli in the county of Carmarthenshire, Wales. It is published on a fortnightly basis in a CD form to hundreds of visually impaired people. It was founded in December 1976 with currently 1000 editions recorded. As of 2015, the editions have been made available online. It is a member of Talking Newspaper Association of the United Kingdom.

References

External links
 
 http://www.communitycreative.co.uk/llanelli/index.html 

Disability mass media
Llanelli
Publications established in 1976
1976 establishments in Wales